The 1902 Brown Bears football team represented Brown University as an independent during the 1902 college football season. Led by first-year head coach J. A. Gammons, Brown compiled a record of 5–4–1.

Schedule

References

Brown
Brown Bears football seasons
Brown Bears football